The Locust Fork River, in the U.S. State of Alabama, is one of three major tributaries of the Black Warrior River, stretching across Blount, and some portions of Etowah, Jefferson and Marshall counties. Anglers hail some of those spots as among the best sport fishing in AL.

The Locust Fork River ranks in the top 2% of the nation's free flowing rivers with “outstandingly remarkable values” in all seven categories of the Nationwide Rivers Inventory of the National Park Service, (https://www.nps.gov/subjects/rivers/alabama.htm).

The Locust Fork is home to the nationally sanctioned annual Locust Fork Canoe and Kayak Races, http://alabamacupraces.com/races.html

In the late 1980s, the Birmingham Water Works proposed damming the river as a source of drinking water.  When those plans became public, the  grass-roots Friends of the Locust Fork River formed to investigate. The group  held public meetings and suggested better sources of water for the metropolis.  Plans for the dam were finally suspended.

History

The Locust Fork is an ancient river with a surprising history. The river and its tributaries have carved a path through the surrounding ridges of sandstone and chert at least a dozen times - geological evidence that this river is older than the hills through which it flows.

That geology demonstrates that across the millennia as the Appalachians and other uplifts of the land slowly took place, the river cut through.  Today it exhibits hairpin curves bordered by steep bluffs, called “entrenched meanders”. Together the river and ridges have created an array of habitats for a distinctively rich diversity of life.  

In spite of threats, the Locust Fork remains free-flowing, preserving some of that rich bio-diversity, although human activity has caused many extinctions of rare and unusual species.

The river provided Native Americans ample food and shelter, resulting in abundant artifacts in the watershed.

The river's winding course caused the early white settlers to build many bridges, some of which survive from the past: Swann Covered Bridge https://en.wikipedia.org/wiki/Swann_Covered_Bridge Horton Mill Covered Bridge

https://en.wikipedia.org/wiki/Horton_Mill_Covered_Bridge and Easley Covered Bridge

Today in Blount County 115 bridges longer than 20 feet currently in operation cross the Locust Fork River.

Settlers also built water-powered grain mills in almost every valley. Most of them are gone.

Gallery

References

External links
 Friends of the Locust Fork River website
 Discovering Alabama: Locust Fork

Rivers of Alabama
Rivers of Blount County, Alabama
Rivers of Etowah County, Alabama
Rivers of Marshall County, Alabama